The Madras International Circuit (MIC, previously known as Madras Motor Race Track and Irungattukottai Race Track) is a permanent motor racing circuit located in Irungattukottai, Chennai, India. It was built in the late 1980s and was inaugurated in 1990. It was the first permanent racing circuit in India and is owned by the Madras Motor Sports Club. In July 2022, the track was rechristened as Madras International Circuit.

History

In 1971, the Madras Motor Sports Club, Coimbatore Auto Sports Club, Karnataka Motor Sports Club along with Calcutta Motor Sports Club and Mumbai's Indian Automotive Racing Club, united to form the Federation of Motor Sports Clubs of India (FMSCI), headquartered in Chennai, to ensure common regulations and orderly conduct of events. Race meets were held on airstrips at Sholavaram in Chennai, Sulur in Coimbatore and Agara in Bangalore. In 1990, the Irungattukottai track was built to provide a permanent structure for racing. Hosts an annual round of the MRF Challenge.

Layout
The track is a Fédération Internationale de l'Automobile and Fédération Internationale de Motocyclisme-certified circuit. The tracks were resurfaced in 2007 and vehicles allowed for races include bikes of all categories and cars up to F3. FIA granted a Grade 2 license to the circuit in 2014.

Events

 Current

 January: Indian Touring Car National Championship, MRF Formula 1600 Series, MRF Saloon Cars, Formula LGB 1300
 February: Indian Touring Car National Championship, MRF Formula 1600 Series, MRF Saloon Cars, Formula LGB 1300
 October: MRF Formula 2000, Indian Touring Car National Championship
 November: Indian Racing League
 December: Indian Racing League, Indian Touring Car National Championship

 Former

 Asia Road Racing Championship (1997, 2009–2011, 2013, 2017–2018)
 Asian Formula Three Championship (2008)
 Formula 4 South East Asia Championship (2018–2019)

Lap records

The official race lap records at the Madras International Circuit are listed as:

See also

 Madras Motor Sports Club

Notes

References

External links

 Irungattukottai Race Track

Motorsport venues in Tamil Nadu
Sports venues in Chennai
1990 establishments in Tamil Nadu
Sports venues completed in 1990
20th-century architecture in India